Ubida amochla is a moth in the family Crambidae. It was described by Turner in 1922. It is found in Australia, where it has been recorded from Queensland.

The wingspan is 26–40 mm. The fore- and hindwings are both whitish.

References

Crambinae
Moths described in 1922